Bard-e Now (also known as Bardūnow) is a village in Ij Rural District, in the Central District of Darab, Fars Province, Iran. At the 2006 census, its population was 212, in 55 families.

References 

Populated places in Estahban County